, or AIU, is a public university located in Akita City, Akita Prefecture, Japan. Established in 2004 and modeled on American liberal arts colleges, AIU is one of the few universities in Japan offering all of its courses in English. It has currently 201 international partner institutions in 51 different countries and regions.

Its undergraduate program offers bachelor's degrees in Global Connectivity, Global Business and Global Studies, and its graduate program offers master's degrees in Japanese Language Teaching, English Language Teaching, and Global Communication Practices. The undergraduate program at Akita International University is unique in Japan. All courses are taught in English, with the exception of foreign language classes. Undergraduate students are expected to study overseas for one year of their academic program. Non-native English speaking students are prepared for using English in the classroom through the intensive English for Academic Purposes (EAP) Program. As of 2022, the president of AIU is Monte Cassim.

Campus

Akita International University campus is located in Akita city (population about 325,000), the capital of Akita Prefecture (population about 1,093,000). The campus is located in a rural environment, but is accessible from downtown Akita city via bus and train and is less than 10 minutes by car from Akita Airport. Adjacent the university is a sports facility run by the local government (basketball, baseball, tennis, soccer, and weight training, etc.). A variety of hiking, cycling, and golf courses are adjacent to the campus. A shopping mall is 10 minutes away from the campus by bus.

The new AIU campus is set on the same location as the previous academic entity known as Minnesota State University in Akita (1990-2003) which operated until the small town of Yuwa Machi was absorbed by Akita City.  The idea for MSUA derived from Akita Prefecture's lengthy sister-city relationship with the city of St. Cloud, Minnesota.

Student life

Accommodation

Akita International University provides a genuine cross-cultural environment for all of its students. Exchange and non degree-seeking international students are guaranteed housing in either the Komachi Dormitory or in the Global Village Apartments. International students usually share a room with a Japanese student.

Clubs and circles
Clubs and Circles at Akita International University are open to all students, including international students. Clubs include:
Kendo,
Tennis,
Futsal,
Table Tennis,
Rubber Baseball,
Basketball,
Volleyball,
Aikido,
Hopping Runners,
Dance, Breakdancing,
Kanto,
Brass Band,
Publishing,
Korean,
Photography,
Parliamentary Debate,
Choir,
A Cappella,
Global Campus Talk,
Light Music,
Ecology & Environment,
Japan Taiwan Conference,
Volunteer,
Service Travel ICC,
Shorinji Kempo,
Japanese Dancing,
Broadcasting,
Latin Culture,
French,
Debate,
Sign Language,
Igo & Shogi,
Piano,
Tea Ceremony,
Judo,
Karate,
Football,
Drama,
Ikebana,
Calligraphy,
Italian,
Mixed Martial Arts,
Rugby

Off-campus activities
Akita International University offers its international students extra-curricular activities designed to improve their understanding of Japanese culture and people, and to provide community outreach opportunities.

Field trips
Field trips are organized each semester. Past field trip destinations have included local manufacturing plants, a sake brewery, a natto (sticky fermented beans) factory, museums, various festivals and events, hot springs (onsen), various cultural and sightseeing landmarks throughout Akita Prefecture, and an opportunity to observe local carpenters build thatched-roof huts.

Home Visit Program
International students are invited to participate in the “Home Visit Program,” which is arranged by a local international organization. Students are introduced to volunteer host families and can visit their home during the weekends and holidays.

Meeting the community
International students have opportunities to interact with local Japanese citizens. They visit elementary schools and junior and senior high schools, where they share their native language and culture. Students are also invited to community events, such as local festivals and cultural events.

Reputation

In 2011, AIU received a grant for the Re-Inventing Japan Project from MEXT (Ministry of Education, Culture, Sports, Science and Technology in Japan), the first case for Japanese Public University.

Rankings
AIU was introduced in Touyou-Keizai: Hontou-ni Tsuyoi Daigaku as being the best university nationwide in the field of international studies. According to the university ranking Yoyogi Seminar Data Research that evaluates the difficulty of admissions into Japanese universities, the liberal arts department of AIU was ranked 3rd in the fields of Economics, Business and Marketing, ahead of universities such as Kyoto University and Osaka University and 2nd in the fields of International Studies and Social Sciences, ahead of reputable universities like Tokyo University of Foreign Studies. Also, AIU was introduced in Shu-kan Diamond : Shushoku ni Tsuyoi Daigaku Ranking as having the third-highest employment rate among all universities, and the highest among public universities. In the national ranking of Sunday Mainichi Journal (weekly news magazine published by Mainichi Shimbun), AIU ranked 4th in terms of teaching quality, 1st in international education and internationalization and 4th in student support services.
According to an April 4, 2017 report in The Japan Times, In the Times Higher Education Japan University Ranking 2017, produced in cooperation with educational services company Benesse Holdings Inc., which emphasizes what the institutions offer students (graded on four categories: educational resources, educational satisfaction, outcomes, and international environment), AIU topped the educational satisfaction ranking out of all universities surveyed.

References

External links
Akita International University Homepage - English / Japanese

Universities and colleges in Akita Prefecture
Buildings and structures in Akita (city)
Educational institutions established in 2004
Public universities in Japan
2004 establishments in Japan